Joseph Gillespie Armstrong (October 15, 1901 - April 23, 1964) was an American suffragan bishop of the Episcopal Diocese of Pennsylvania from 1949 until November 7, 1960, when he was elected coadjutor. He succeeded Rt. Rev. Oliver J. Hart as Bishop of Pennsylvania when Bishop Hart retired on July 19, 1963. However Bishop Armstrong's diocesan episcopate only lasted nine months before his death.

Biography 
Armstrong was born in Warren, Pennsylvania, but raised in Virginia. Johns Hopkins University in Baltimore, Maryland awarded him a B.A. in 1928; after which he graduated from General Theological Seminary in 1931.

Ordained priest in 1932, Rev. Armstrong served as rector of Severn Parish (a/k/a St. Stephens Crownsville) near Annapolis, Maryland, and of Christ Church (Georgetown, Washington, D.C.), then as chaplain in the United States Navy in World War II. After his military discharge, Rev. Armstrong served several years as rector at St. Mary's Episcopal Church in Ardmore, Pennsylvania.

On May 11, 1949 the diocesan convention elected the Rev. Armstrong as suffragan to assist Bishop Hart. The Presiding Bishop Henry Knox Sherrill assisted bishop Hart and bishop suffragan Remington of Pennsylvania in his consecration, as did bishops, Powell of Maryland and bishop suffragan Banyard of New Jersey on October 28, 1949. He was installed as Suffragan bishop of Pennsylvania on November 15, 1949. Bishop Armstrong then assisted the diocesan bishop Hart in administering the diocese for many years until Rt.Rev. Hart's retirement. On April 1, 1964, Robert L. DeWitt, suffragan bishop of Michigan, was elected as his coadjutor, and became his successor.

Bishop Armstrong died at home in Bryn Mawr, Pennsylvania, survived by his second wife and daughters. He is buried at Arlington National Cemetery.

References

20th-century Anglican bishops in the United States
1901 births
1964 deaths
People from Warren, Pennsylvania
Johns Hopkins University alumni
General Theological Seminary alumni
Burials at Arlington National Cemetery
Episcopal bishops of Pennsylvania